Donacia semicuprea is a species of leaf beetles of the subfamily of Donaciinae.

Distribution
The species can be found in the following European territories: Austria, Belarus, Bosnia and Herzegovina, Great Britain including the Isle of Man, Bulgaria, Croatia, Czech Republic, mainland Denmark, Estonia, Finland, Germany, Hungary, Ireland, mainland Italy, Kaliningrad region, Latvia, Liechtenstein, Lithuania, Luxembourg, Moldova, mainland Norway, Poland, Romania, all of Russia except the north, Slovakia, Slovenia, Sweden, the Netherlands, Ukraine, and Yugoslavia including Serbia. Kosovo, Voivodina and Montenegro.

Ecology and habitats
Adult beetles feed on leaves Glyceria maxima and Glyceria notata. The pupa develops among the roots of Sparganium erectum. The larvae feed on roots and leaves of the large Manik different kinds of manna (Glyceria).

References

Beetles described in 1796
Donaciinae